The 1976 World Sports Car Championship (officially the World Championship for Sports Cars,) was a motor racing series open to Group 6 cars, (officially Two-Seater Racing Cars (Group 6)). The championship was contested over a seven race series which ran from 4 April to 19 September and included a secondary award, the 1976 FIA Cup for Cars up to 2 Litres. 1976 was the 24th season of FIA World Sportscar Championship racing.

The championship was won by Porsche and the FIA Cup by Lola.

Schedule

Season results

Races

† - In the race, Ickx finished behind two Group 7 CanAm cars, but these large capacity cars were not eligible for Group 6 championship points.

Results - 1976 World Championship for Sports Cars
Points were awarded to the top ten finishers in each race in the order of 20-15-12-10-8-6-4-3-2-1. Manufacturers were only awarded points for their highest finishing car in each race with no points awarded for any additional placing gained.

Only the best 5 points finishes per manufacturer could be retained towards the championship, with any other points earned not included in the totals. Discarded points are shown within brackets in the table below.

 The opening round at the Nürburgring was also contested by Group 4 GT cars which were not eligible for World Championship points.
 The fifth round at Mosport was also contested by Group 7 Can-Am cars which were not eligible for World Championship points.

The cars
The following cars contributed to the nett championship pointscores of their respective manufacturers:
 Porsche 908/4 & Porsche 936
 Alpine Renault A442
 Osella PA4 BMW
 Lola T292/4 BMW, Lola T292 Ford, Lola T292 T290/4 Ford & Lola T292 Hart & Lola T286 Ford
 March 75S BMW
 Chevron B36 ROC & Chevron B23 Ford & Chevron B26 Hart & Chevron B26 Ford
 Alfa Romeo 33TS12 
 Mirage GR8 Ford
 KMW SP30 Porsche
 McLaren M8F Chevrolet
 Sauber SC5 BMW
 Abarth-Osella SE027 BMW
 Cheetah G601 BMW

FIA Cup for Cars up to 2 Litres
The 1976 FIA Cup for Cars up to 2 Litres was contested concurrently with the 1976 World Championship for Sports Cars.

World Championship of Makes

For the 1976 season, the FIA chose to run two separate World Championships for "sportscars".  Open-cockpit Group 6 cars would contest the new World Championship for Sports Cars, while production-based cars, including Group 5 Special Production Cars, would now contest the World Championship for Makes. The 1976 24 Hours of Le Mans, which was open to both types of cars, did not count towards either championship. The World Championship for Makes was won by Porsche.

References

External links
 World Sportscar Championship 1976, www.racingsportscars.com (Also includes details of World Championship for Makes 1976)

World Sportscar Championship seasons
World Sportscar Championship